Marco Carparelli (born 4 June 1976 in Finale Ligure) is an Italian footballer who plays as a striker for Pietra Ligure.

Career

Player
Carparelli started his career at Vado of Serie D. He then transferred to Sampdoria, and made his Serie A debut on  21 September 1996, A.S. Roma 1-4 lose to Sampdoria, after spent a year at Serie B for Chievo. He then played for Torino (Serie B) and Empoli (Serie A). He joined Genoa of Serie B in  summer 1999, and left for Empoli of Serie A again in January 2003.

He played for Empoli until January 2004, while he left for Como for their remain Serie B campaign, but Como finished the last in the table. Carparelli signed for Genoa again, also at Serie B. But he left on loan for A.C. Siena of Serie A in the first half of the season.

In summer 2005, he joined Cremonese, due to Genoa match fixing and relegated and followed to club to fall to Serie C1 in summer 2006.

In July 2007 joined to Serie B newcomer Grosseto and in October 2009 moved to Pisa until the end of the season 2011-12.

Since the summer 2012 he plays for Pietra Ligure in Prima Categoria Liguria/A.

References

External links
 gazzetta.it

1976 births
Living people
Italian footballers
Italy under-21 international footballers
U.C. Sampdoria players
A.C. ChievoVerona players
Torino F.C. players
Empoli F.C. players
Genoa C.F.C. players
Como 1907 players
A.C.N. Siena 1904 players
U.S. Cremonese players
F.C. Grosseto S.S.D. players
Pisa S.C. players
A.S. Cittadella players
F.C. Vado players
Serie A players
Serie B players
Serie C players
Serie D players
Association football forwards
Sportspeople from the Province of Savona
Footballers from Liguria